Aglossa baba is a species of snout moth in the genus Aglossa. It was described by Harrison Gray Dyar Jr. in 1914. It is found in North America, including the type location of Texas.

References

Moths described in 1914
Pyralini
Moths of North America